The 1908–09 Penn Quakers men's ice hockey season was the 5th season of play for the program.

Season
After remaining dormant for several years, Penn restarted its ice hockey program in 1908. The team used the rowing room at the campus gymnasium to practice while waiting for the weather to grow cold. The team arranged to play three games in Cleveland against local teams but those plans had to be changed and Cornell stepped in for all three matches. Penn tied the first game before losing the remaining two in the team's official return to action. The team scheduled several games to occur over the succeeding month or so but, due to the warm weather, none of the games were played and the season was essentially cancelled in mid-February.

The team did not have a head coach but Duncan Worrell served as team manager.

Roster

Standings

Schedule and Results

|-
!colspan=12 style=";" | Regular Season

References

Penn Quakers men's ice hockey seasons
Penn
Penn
Penn
Penn